Adrien Plavsic (born January 13, 1970) is a Canadian ice hockey defenceman who played in the National Hockey League (NHL).

Biography
As a youth, Plavsic played in the 1982 and 1983 Quebec International Pee-Wee Hockey Tournaments with a minor ice hockey team from the North Shore of Montreal.

In the NHL, he played for the St. Louis Blues, Vancouver Canucks, Tampa Bay Lightning and the Mighty Ducks of Anaheim. Drafted 30th overall by St. Louis in the 1988 NHL Entry Draft, Plavsic played 214 regular season games in the NHL, scoring 16 goals and 56 assists for 72 points and clocking up 151 penalty minutes. Since 1998 he has played in Switzerland's Nationalliga A, (EHC Basel). He's now the assistant coach at Lausanne Hockey Club.

In 2005, he became Swiss citizen through marriage.

Career statistics

Regular season and playoffs

International

References

External links
 Team bio (in German)
 

1970 births
Atlanta Knights players
Canadian emigrants to Switzerland
Canadian expatriate ice hockey players in Switzerland
Canadian ice hockey defencemen
Canadian people of Serbian descent
EHC Basel players
Francophone Quebec people
Hamilton Canucks players
Ice hockey people from Montreal
Ice hockey players at the 1992 Winter Olympics
Lausanne HC players
Living people
Long Beach Ice Dogs (IHL) players
Mighty Ducks of Anaheim players
Milwaukee Admirals (IHL) players
Naturalised citizens of Switzerland
New Hampshire Wildcats men's ice hockey players
Olympic ice hockey players of Canada
Olympic medalists in ice hockey
Olympic silver medalists for Canada
People from Dollard-des-Ormeaux
Peoria Rivermen (IHL) players
Revier Löwen players
St. Louis Blues draft picks
St. Louis Blues players
Tampa Bay Lightning players
Vancouver Canucks players
ZSC Lions players
Medalists at the 1992 Winter Olympics
Canadian expatriate ice hockey players in Germany
Canadian expatriate ice hockey players in the United States